István Pálfi (23 September 1966, Berettyóújfalu – 15 July 2006, Berettyóújfalu) was a Hungarian politician and Member of the European Parliament (MEP) with the Hungarian Civic Party, part of the European People's Party. He sat on the European Parliament's Committee on Budgetary Control and its Committee on Regional Development.

Pálfi was a substitute for the Committee on Budgets and a member of the Delegation to the EU-Ukraine Parliamentary Cooperation Committee.

He died after a long illness in his home town.

Personal life
He was married. His wife was Anikó Pálfiné Pántya.

Education
 2002: Personnel Manager, University of Pécs
 International Relations Department, Budapest University of Economics (university leaving certificate, state examination in progress)

Career
 1994-1996: Various posts with tourism firms
 since 1996: Adult education and employment programmes
 since 1993: Berettyóújfalu town chairman of the FIDESZ party
 1995-1996 and 1998-2000: Vice-Chairman of the regional steering committee, Hajdú-Bihar region
 2000-2002: delegate, national steering committee
 Deputy Mayor, Berettyóújfalu
 1998-2002: Chairman of the Economic Affairs Committee, Hajdú-Bihar Regional Authority
 1999-2002: Member of the Northern Great Plain Regional Development Council, Chairman of the Human Resources Working Committee
 2002-2004: Member of the Hungarian Parliament, member, Social and Family Affairs Committee, Chairman of the Supervisory Subcommittee

See also
 2004 European Parliament election in Hungary

References

External links
 EU Parliament page of István Pálfi
 

1966 births
2006 deaths
Fidesz politicians
Fidesz MEPs
Members of the National Assembly of Hungary (2002–2006)
MEPs for Hungary 2004–2009
Corvinus University of Budapest alumni
People from Berettyóújfalu